The Victoria Cougars were a major league professional ice hockey team that played in the Pacific Coast Hockey Association (PCHA) from 1911 to 1924 under various names, and (after the PCHA's merger with the Western Canada Hockey League) in the Western Hockey League (WHL) from 1924 to 1926. The team was based in Victoria, British Columbia and won the Stanley Cup in 1925, becoming the final non-NHL team to win the Cup.

History 
The original Victoria franchise of the PCHA, the Victoria Senators, were formed in 1911, and became the Victoria Aristocrats in 1915. The Aristocrats challenged the Toronto Blueshirts for the Stanley Cup the following year, but lost. In 1916 the team was forced to move to Spokane, Washington, after having their arena (Patrick Arena) commandeered by the Canadian military. The club folded the following year as the Spokane Canaries.

A new team was formed in 1918 and again were dubbed the Victoria Aristocrats, with players from the folded Portland Rosebuds. In 1922 they changed their name to the Victoria Cougars. Led by coach Lester Patrick, the Cougars would win the Stanley Cup in 1925 against the Montreal Canadiens of the National Hockey League (NHL). The Cougars were the last non-NHL team to hoist the Stanley Cup as well as the last west coast team to win it until the Anaheim Ducks did so in 2007. They would attempt to repeat as champions in 1926 but they were unsuccessful as they lost the final series to the NHL's Montreal Maroons. 

The WHL dissolved after the season. That spring, a group of businessmen from Detroit won an NHL expansion franchise and bought the rights to many of the players from the Stanley Cup finalist Cougars. The new NHL franchise would retain the nickname "Cougars" in tribute. The Detroit Cougars would later be renamed the Detroit Falcons, and would ultimately be renamed the Detroit Red Wings.

Among the notable players who played for the Cougars were Hall of Famers Hec Fowler (goaltender), Frank Foyston, Frank Fredrickson, Hap Holmes (goaltender), Clem Loughlin, Harry Meeking and Jack Walker.

Seasons

Note: W = Wins, L = Losses, T = Ties, GF= Goals For, GA = Goals Against

Victoria Cougars: 1925 Stanley Cup champions

References

Bibliography

See also
List of ice hockey teams in British Columbia
List of Stanley Cup champions

External links
Victoria Aristocrats of the PCHA (1911–16, 1918–22) at HockeyDB
Victoria Cougars of the PCHA (1922–24) at HockeyDB
Victoria Cougars of the WCHL/WHL (1924–26) at HockeyDB

Defunct ice hockey teams in Canada
History of the Detroit Red Wings
Ice hockey teams in British Columbia
Pacific Coast Hockey Association teams
Cougars
Ice hockey clubs established in 1911
1911 establishments in British Columbia
Ice hockey clubs disestablished in 1926
1926 disestablishments in British Columbia